Magnolia Hill Productions, is a film and television production company founded by Sam Haskell, former Executive Vice President and Worldwide Head of Television at the William Morris Agency.  The company currently has an exclusive deal with Warner Bros television.

Established in 2013, Magnolia Hill was created to bring forth family friendly and inspirational content.  The company has produced multiple shows with the country music icon Dolly Parton.  They include Dolly Parton's Coat of Many Colors and the Emmy nominated Dolly Parton's Christmas of Many Colors: Circle of Love both based on Parton's childhood and airing on NBC.  Most recently, Magnolia Hill produced Dolly Parton's Heartstrings for Netflix, an eight episode anthology series based on Parton's songs and stories.

Filmography

References

External links
 Magnolia Hill Productions
 Sam Haskell

Film production companies of the United States
Television production companies of the United States